Terje Rød-Larsen (born 22 November 1947) is a Norwegian diplomat, politician, and sociologist.

Rød-Larsen came to wide international prominence as a key figure in the 1990s negotiations that led to the Oslo Accords—the first-ever agreements between Israel and the Palestine Liberation Organization (PLO) --  when he served as the Director of the Fafo institute. He is played by the actor Andrew Scott in the film Oslo, based on the play of the same name.

In 1993, Rød-Larsen was appointed Ambassador and Special Adviser for the Middle East Peace process to the Norwegian Foreign Minister, and the following year, he became the United Nations Special Coordinator in the Occupied Territories at the rank of Under-Secretary-General.

Rød-Larsen briefly served as the Deputy Prime Minister and Minister for Planning and Cooperation of Norway in the Jagland cabinet in 1996. He had to resign after a tax affair regarding him, came to public attention.

Rød-Larsen then returned to the United Nations, where he again became an Under-Secretary-General, serving as the UN Special Coordinator for the Middle East Peace Process and Personal Representative of the Secretary-General to the Palestine Liberation Organization and the Palestinian Authority from 1999 to 2004.

From 2004 to 2020, Rød-Larsen has been the president of the International Peace Institute (IPI), based in New York City, adjacent to the United Nations, which the IPI works with extensively. He resigned in 2020 over previously undisclosed links to Jeffrey Epstein.

Biography
Rød-Larsen grew up in Bergen and studied social sciences, culminating in a Ph.D. in sociology. He taught at Norwegian universities until 1981, when he helped found FAFO, a research organization funded by the Norwegian Confederation of Trade Unions.

Early Middle East work
In 1989 Rød-Larsen moved to Cairo, when his wife Mona Juul, who worked for the Norwegian Ministry of Foreign Affairs, was stationed there. He continued to work for FAFO, as the organization had become more internationally oriented during the 1980s. Rød-Larsen performed a detailed sociological study of living conditions in the West Bank, Gaza and Eastern Jerusalem. In the course of this work, Rød-Larsen made contacts that proved to be useful in secret negotiations between Israel and the PLO.

Oslo Accords
When serving as the Director of the Fafo institute in the early 1990s, Rød-Larsen became a key figure in the 1990s negotiations that led to the Oslo Accords --  the first-ever agreements between Israel and the Palestine Liberation Organization (PLO). He served a pivotal role in the negotiations not only overtly, but in secret back-channel maneuvers and communications -- largely arranged and facilitated by him and his wife, Norwegian diplomat Mona Juul. She was able to facilitate high-level contacts with the Norwegian foreign minister, Johan Jørgen Holst, who was instrumental in reaching the Oslo Accords -- leading to the peace agreement signing on September 13, 1993 in Washington D.C.The 2016-2017 Broadway play, Oslo, by noted playwright J. T. Rogers, is a widely-praised dramatization of the previously unheralded secret work of Rød-Larsen and his wife, and others, in developing the back-channel communications that (reportedly) saved the Oslo negotiations from collapsing.

The same year Rød-Larsen became formally employed by the  Norwegian Ministry of Foreign Affairs as a special advisor on Middle Eastern affairs.

Mid-1990s to Mid-2000s
From 1994 to 1996, Rød-Larsen served as former Secretary-General Boutros Boutros-Ghali's first "Special Coordinator in the Occupied Territories."

In 1996, Rød-Larsen served briefly as minister of administration in the government of Thorbjørn Jagland, before being forced to resign as the result of a tax scandal.

In 9/9/1999, Rød-Larsen was appointed as UN Secretary-General Kofi Annan's personal representative to the PLO and Palestinian Authority on the West Bank and the Gaza Strip. He was also the UN Special Coordinator for peace negotiations in the Middle East. He subsequently left the post in 2004 to become President of the International Peace Academy, a NYC-based think tank, and was also designated as UN Special Representative (Date of Appointment : 3/1/2005) for the implementation of Security Council Resolution 1559, which calls for Syrian withdrawal of Lebanon and the disarmament of Hezbollah.

2006 Israel-Lebanon conflict

16 August

Rød-Larsen was sent by U.N. Secretary-General Kofi Annan to Lebanon and Israel to follow up on the implementation of the cease-fire resolution, the United Nations announced on 16 August 2006.

20 August
On this date Rød-Larsen told reporters. "There is a golden opportunity for Lebanon to solidify its democracy, to assert it authority, to produce a situation where Lebanon can be reconstructed and where Lebanese can live peacefully with its neighbors in prosperity. All this is at hand."

22 August

The United Nations special envoy to Syria and Lebanon said on 22 August 2006 it could take the Lebanese army and international troops two to three months to fill a "security vacuum" in southern Lebanon and warned that "unintended" acts could spark renewed fighting.

"There is now a security vacuum which the Lebanese government is trying to fill" with the help of international forces, said Terje Rød-Larsen. "But I think realistically, up to a point, you will have such a vacuum in Lebanon for the next two, three months," he added. "The situation is still extremely fragile... Unintended incidents can kick off renewed violence, which might escalate and spin out of control."

Controversy
In 2020 media revealed that he Rød-Larsen had borrowed 130,000 USD from Jeffrey Epstein. During the week that preceded 18 October 2020, the Norwegian Foreign Ministry requested that Rød-Larsen clarify the ties between Epstein and Rød-Larsen. On 21 October Dagens Næringsliv said that  [sometime] after [the money was borrowed], Rød-Larsen directed IPI to pay 100,000 dollars to Epstein, although an audit by accounting firm KPMG found no payment was made. On 29 October 2020, Rød-Larsen resigned  the presidency of the foundation (IPI).

References  	

External links

 Innlegg: Fredsmeglingens fallgruver [Received articles: The pitfalls of peace-brokering]. 7 May 2021. Dagens Næringsliv
 Rød-Larsen's wife, Mona Juul's house bugged, Nettavisen'', 20 January 2004.
 Rød-Larsen at the UN, 13 July 2004.
 Rød-Larsen overseeing Syrian withdrawal from Lebanon, 17 March 2005.
 Foreign ministry to investigate money to Rød-Larsen, 24 April 2002
Rød-Larsen wanted to become United Nations-chief (Rød-Larsen ville bli FN-sjef)

1947 births
Living people
Israeli–Palestinian peace process
Diplomats from Bergen
Norwegian sociologists
Norwegian officials of the United Nations
Special Envoys of the Secretary-General of the United Nations